The Copa del Rey de Balonmano 2013–14 is the 39th edition of the Copa del Rey de Balonmano, hosted by Liga ASOBAL. The tournament began on 19 and 20 October with First Round matches.

Atlético Madrid is the defending champion but it will be unable to defend its title as the club was shut down in July 2013.

FC Barcelona won its eighteenth Copa del Rey title, and the first after four years (last in 2010) by defeating BM Granollers 42–32 in the Final.

Competition format

Knockout stage
First round (single match)
Second round (single match)
Round of 16 (single match)
Quarter-final (two legs)

Final four
Semifinals (single match)
Final (single match)

Calendar

First round
Matches played on 19 and 20 October 2013.

All times are CEST.

|}

Matches

Second round
Matches played on 6 and 7 November 2013.

All times are CET.

|}

Matches

Round of 16
Matches to be played on 11 December 2013.

All times are CET.

|}

Matches

Quarter finals
Quarter finals draw was held on December 21 during the RFEBM general meeting in Barcelona. This round is to be played over two legs. The matches are scheduled to 26 February (1st leg) and 5 March 2014 (2nd leg).

All times are CET.

|}

Matches

First leg

Second leg

Final four
The Final Four will be held in Pamplona, Navarre at the Pabellón Anaitasuna, with the matches being played on 3 and 4 May. The draw was conducted on 16 April.

Semifinals

Final

Top goalscorers
Updated after Final. Players in bold, still active in the competition.

See also
Liga ASOBAL 2013–14
2013 Copa ASOBAL

References

External links
Copa del Rey at ASOBAL.es
Copa del Rey at RFEBM.net

2013-14
2013–14 in Spanish handball